The  is Japan's highest private award for lifetime achievement in the arts and sciences. It is given not only to those that are top representatives of their own respective fields, but to "those who have contributed significantly to the scientific, cultural, and spiritual betterment of mankind". The Kyoto Prize was created in collaboration with the Nobel Foundation and is regarded by many as Japan's version of the Nobel Prize, representing one of the most prestigious awards available in fields that are not traditionally honored with a Nobel. 

The prizes are endowed with 100 million yen (roughly 800,000 USD) per category and have been awarded annually since 1985 by the Inamori Foundation, founded by Kazuo Inamori. The laureates are announced each June; the prize presentation ceremony and related events are held in Kyoto, Japan, each November.

Categories and fields
The Kyoto Prize consists of three different categories, each with 4 subfields. The subfields rotate every year to create a diverse group of Laureates. The categories and fields are:
Kyoto Prize in Advanced Technology
With Fields: Electronics, Biotechnology and Medical Technology, Materials Science and Engineering, and Information Science.

Kyoto Prize in Basic Sciences
With Fields: Mathematical Sciences, Biological Sciences, Earth and Planetary Sciences (Astronomy and Astrophysics), and Life Sciences (With the fifth subfield of Cognitive Sciences with one Laureate, Noam Chomsky in 1988).

Kyoto Prize in Arts and Philosophy
With Fields: Music, Arts, Theater (Cinema), and Thought and Ethics

Laureates

With the 2015 Kyoto laureates, the three-category prizes have honored 99 individuals and one foundation (the Nobel Foundation). Individual laureates range from scientists, engineers, and researchers to philosophers, painters, architects, sculptors, musicians, and film directors. The United States has produced the most recipients (44), followed by Japan (19), the United Kingdom (12), and France (8).

See also 

 List of general science and technology awards 
 Kyoto Prize in Advanced Technology
 Kyoto Prize in Basic Sciences
 Kyoto Prize in Arts and Philosophy
 List of Kyoto Prize winners

References

External links 
 
 Inamori Foundation
 Kyoto Prize at Oxford 
 Kyoto Prize Symposium

 
Academic awards
International awards
Awards established in 1985
1985 establishments in Japan